Sir Malcolm Keith Sykes  (13 September 1925 – 17 November 2019) was an English consultant anaesthetist.

Early life and education

Sykes was born in Clevedon, Somerset, the only son of economist Joseph Sykes  (1899–1967) and Phyllis Mary Greenwood. He studied at Magdalene College, Cambridge, then underwent training in anaesthetics while serving in the Royal Army Medical Corps, and at University College Hospital and Massachusetts General Hospital.

Career

In 1958, he joined the Postgraduate Medical School at Hammersmith Hospital as a lecturer in anaesthesia and consultant anaesthetist, becoming a reader there in 1967 and a professor of clinical anaesthesia in 1970.

He joined the University of Oxford as Nuffield professor of anaesthetics in 1980 and became an Honorary Fellow of Pembroke College in 1996.

He is the author of books about the clinical measurement, treatment of respiratory failure, and the history of anaesthesia.

A 1997 interview with him, by Lady Wendy Ball, is in Oxford Brookes' Medical Sciences Video Archive, catalogue number MSVA159.

He was knighted in the 1991 Birthday Honours, and has also been elected a Fellow of the Royal College of Anaesthetists, (FFARCS), an Honorary Fellow of the Australian and New Zealand College of Anaesthestists (HonFANZCA) and an Honorary Fellow of the College of Anaesthetists of South Africa (HonFCA (SA)).

References

External links 

 

1925 births
2019 deaths
People from Somerset
Fellows of the Royal College of Anaesthetists
Knights Bachelor
Alumni of Magdalene College, Cambridge
Royal Army Medical Corps officers
Fellows of Pembroke College, Oxford
20th-century British Army personnel